Paul Garner (born 1 December 1955) is an English former professional footballer who played as a left back in the Football League for Huddersfield Town, Sheffield United, Gillingham and Mansfield Town. At Mansfield he helped them win the 1986–87 Associate Members' Cup, playing in the final.

References

1955 births
Living people
People from Edlington
Footballers from Doncaster
Association football defenders
English footballers
Huddersfield Town A.F.C. players
Sheffield United F.C. players
Gillingham F.C. players
Mansfield Town F.C. players
English Football League players